Dennis the Menace is an American sitcom based on the Hank Ketcham comic strip of the same name. It preceded The Ed Sullivan Show on Sunday evenings on CBS from October 4, 1959 to July 7, 1963. The series stars Jay North as Dennis Mitchell; Herbert Anderson as his father, Henry; Gloria Henry as his mother, Alice; Joseph Kearns as George Wilson; Gale Gordon as George's brother, John Wilson; Sylvia Field as George's wife, Martha Wilson; and Sara Seegar as John's wife, Eloise Wilson.

Originally sponsored by Kellogg's cereals and Best Foods (Skippy peanut butter), the series was produced by Dariell Productions and Screen Gems.

Plot
The show follows the Mitchell family – Henry, Alice, and their only child, Dennis, an energetic, trouble-prone, mischievous, but well-meaning boy, who often tangles first with his peace-and-quiet-loving neighbor, George Wilson, a retired salesman, and later with George's brother John, a writer. Dennis is basically a good, well-intentioned boy who always tries to help people, but winds up making situations worse. Mr. Wilson has a love-hate relationship toward Dennis who did not realize the aggravation that he would cause. He called Mr. Wilson his "best friend" or "Good Ol' Mr. Wilson".

History

With CBS seeking to replace the hit show it had lost when it allowed Leave It to Beaver to migrate to ABC, a pilot episode titled "Dennis Goes to the Movies" was filmed in late 1958.

In early 1959, CBS consented to air the program at 7:30 pm EST on Sunday evenings after Lassie. After viewing these episodes, CBS determined that Dennis' antics had to be toned down lest his actions would encourage children watching the show to imitate Dennis.

On February 17, 1962, after filming the show's 100th episode, Joseph Kearns died of a cerebral hemorrhage. In a 2010 interview, actress Gloria Henry revealed Kearns followed a strict six-week Metrecal diet that may have contributed to his death. The following two episodes were filmed without the character of Mr. Wilson. Gale Gordon joined the cast for the last six episodes of the season as Mr. Wilson's brother John. It was explained that John was staying as a guest while George was settling an estate. Sylvia Field, who played Martha Wilson, was let go at the end of the season. In the fourth and final season, John Wilson purchased the house from his brother, although where George and Martha had moved was never explained. He was joined by his wife Eloise, played by Sara Seegar. Final references to George and Martha Wilson were made early in the fourth season, although they were not mentioned by name after the first episode. George Wilson was referred to as "the other Mr. Wilson" in the second episode, and John Wilson says in the seventh episode that he bought the house from his brother. After that, the original Wilsons were never mentioned again.

By the end of the show's fourth season, Jay North was nearly 12 years old and was outgrowing the antics associated with his character. CBS canceled Dennis the Menace in early 1963.

Syndication
In 1963, NBC began airing reruns of the series on Saturday mornings for two seasons – the show entered syndication in 1965. It has run consistently on local stations over subsequent years. On July 1, 1985, the Nickelodeon cable network began airing the series, and continued until October 22, 1994, after Nick Jr. It also aired on TV Land from 2002 to 2003. On January 3, 2011, Dennis the Menace began airing on Antenna TV.

The show was exported to the United Kingdom and shown on the ITV network, with 103 episodes airing in the London region between 1960 and 1966.  To avoid confusion with the British comic character, the series was known in the UK as Just Dennis.

Cast

Main characters
 Dennis Mitchell (Jay North) is the series protagonist (146 episodes, 1959–63).
 Henry Mitchell (Herbert Anderson) is Dennis' father and Alice's husband (144 episodes, 1959–63).
 Alice Mitchell (Gloria Henry) is Henry Mitchell's wife and Dennis' mother (145 episodes, 1959–63).
 Mr. George Wilson (Joseph Kearns) is the Mitchells' neighbor; he is often exasperated with Dennis' antics, though is proud that Dennis considers him his best friend. George has a Cairn terrier named Fremont. Kearns appeared in 101 episodes from 1959 to 1962; his last work was aired posthumously in the episode "The Man Next Door" on May 6, 1962.
 Mrs. Martha Wilson (Sylvia Field) is George Wilson's wife, a loving, grandmotherly type neighbor who enjoys Dennis' company. The Wilsons had no children. Martha Wilson was written out of the series after Joseph Kearns' death (90 episodes, 1959–62).
 Margaret Wade (Jeannie Russell) is a snooty but good girl with a crush on Dennis (38 episodes, 1959–63).
 Tommy Anderson (Billy Booth) is Dennis' closest friend (111 episodes, 1959–63).
 Mr. John Wilson (Gale Gordon) is George Wilson's brother. Gordon's first episode is "John Wilson's Cushion" on May 27, 1962. Gordon appeared in 43 episodes in 1962 and 1963.
 Eloise Wilson (Sara Seegar) is John Wilson's wife (36 episodes, 1962–63).

Recurring characters
 Seymour Williams (Robert John Pittman) is Dennis' friend (31 episodes, 1961–63).
 The Bradys – Johnny is Dennis' nemesis, the neighborhood braggart, played by Gregory Irvin; Laurence Haddon was cast as Johnny's father Charles Brady.
 Sergeant Harold Mooney (George Cisar) is a policeman (31 episodes, 1960–1963). In some episodes, Mooney's first name was Ralph.
 Mrs. Lucy Elkins (Irene Tedrow) is a Mitchell neighbor (26 episodes) and an avowed enemy of both George and John Wilson.
 Mr. Otis Quigley (Willard Waterman) is the grocer (14 episodes).
 Miss Esther Cathcart (Mary Wickes) is a spinster who chases every single man in sight (10 episodes, 1959–62).
 Mr. Krinkie (Charles Seel) is the newspaper editor (nine episodes, 1960–63).
 Grandma Mitchell (Kathleen Mulqueen) is Henry's mother, who stayed with the Mitchells during the second season while Alice was away taking care of her father. Mulqueen joined the cast for eight episodes while Gloria Henry was on maternity leave.
 Joey McDonald (Gil Smith) is Dennis' friend (eight episodes, 1959–60).
 Mrs. Schooner (Lillian Culver) is a local socialite, volunteer, and outdoor enthusiast (seven episodes, 1960–63).
 Mr. Lawrence Finch (Charles Lane) is the drugstore owner (six episodes, 1960–62).
 Stewart (Ron Howard) is Dennis' friend (six episodes, 1959–60). Howard left to join the cast of The Andy Griffith Show.
 Mr. Dorfman (Robert B. Williams) is a postman (five episodes, 1959–60).
 Mrs. Dorothy Holland (Helen Kleeb) is a Mitchell neighbor and Mrs. Elkins' friend. Kleeb appeared in five episodes from 1959 to 1962, three as Mrs. Holland.
 Mr. Merrivale (Will Wright) is a nurseryman who is considered a shady businessman by most of the neighborhood (four episodes, 1959–61).
 Uncle Ned Matthews (Edward Everett Horton) is George and John Wilson's uncle (three episodes, 1962–63).
 Opie Swanson (Dub Taylor) is an electrician (three episodes, 1960).
 Buzz (Chubby Johnson) is the neighborhood handyman (three episodes, 1961–62).
 Foster A. Steward (Ned Wever) is the Chief of Police (two episodes, 1960).

Episodes

Reception

Home media
Shout! Factory has released all four seasons on DVD in Region 1. On August 7, 2012, Shout! Factory released a 20-episode best-of set Dennis the Menace – 20 Timeless Episodes.

See also

Dennis the Menace (film)

References

External links 

 

1959 American television series debuts
1963 American television series endings
1950s American sitcoms
1960s American sitcoms
Black-and-white American television shows
CBS original programming
Dennis the Menace (U.S. comics) television series
English-language television shows
Television series about children
Television series about families
Television shows set in Kansas
Television shows based on comic strips
Television series by Sony Pictures Television
Television series by Screen Gems